Ben Guillory (born Bennet Guillory on November 7, 1949 in Baton Rouge, Louisiana) is an American actor, theatre producer and director.

Biography

Raised in San Francisco, California, Guillory co-founded the Robey Theatre Company in honor of actor, activist, and operatic singer Paul Robeson, with actor Danny Glover in Los Angeles in 1994, and currently serves as its artistic director. He received an Ovation Award nomination for Featured Actor in a Play in 2008, for his performance as Wining Boy in The Piano Lesson produced at The Hayworth Theatre in Los Angeles.

Filmography

References

External links 
 

American male television actors
American male film actors
American theatre managers and producers
American theatre directors
Living people
1949 births